Yuriy Evgenevich Lorentsson (2 December 1930 – 24 December 2002) was a Russian rowing coxswain. He was the second rower, after Briton Jack Beresford, to compete at five Olympics. In 1960 he was the coxswain of the Soviet boat which was eliminated in the repechage of the eight event. Four years later he finished fifth with the Soviet boat in the eight competition. At the 1968 Games in Mexico City he won the bronze medal as cox of the Soviet boat in the eights event. In 1972 he coxed the Soviet boat which finished fifth in the coxed pair competition. His last Olympic appearance was in Montreal at the 1976 Olympics when he won the silver medal as part of the Soviet boat in the coxed pairs event.

Lorentsson began with long-distance running and only in 1958 started training in rowing, following his elder brother Valentin who already competed as a coxswain. His career lasted until 1979, when he won a bronze medal at national championships. During this period, besides his Olympic achievements, Lorentsson won a silver at the 1962 World Rowing Championships and four European medals.

See also
 List of athletes with the most appearances at Olympic Games

References

External links
 

1930 births
2002 deaths
Russian male rowers
Soviet male rowers
Coxswains (rowing)
Olympic rowers of the Soviet Union
Rowers at the 1960 Summer Olympics
Rowers at the 1964 Summer Olympics
Rowers at the 1968 Summer Olympics
Rowers at the 1972 Summer Olympics
Rowers at the 1976 Summer Olympics
Olympic silver medalists for the Soviet Union
Olympic bronze medalists for the Soviet Union
Olympic medalists in rowing
World Rowing Championships medalists for the Soviet Union
Medalists at the 1976 Summer Olympics
Medalists at the 1968 Summer Olympics
Rowers from Saint Petersburg
European Rowing Championships medalists